Hybrid tea may refer to:

Any hybrid of tea (Camellia sinensis) with other related plants (e.g. C. sasanqua)
The Hybrid tea rose cultivar group